The Kenneth W. Mildenberger Prize is an annual prize given to a language translator by the Modern Language Association.

Eligibility 

The 2017 prize will be awarded for a book published in 2015 or 2016.

Notable winners 

Past winners of the prize include:

References

External links
 

Academic awards